VfB Stuttgart reached the UEFA Champions League for the first time in more than ten years, following a surprising runner-up position in Bundesliga. Coach Felix Magath was hailed as the man behind the success, in his second full season at the helm, managing to unite a squad with lesser-known players to form a side strong enough to overhaul reigning champions Borussia Dortmund for the automatic qualification spot. It was also the breakthrough season of exciting young talents such as Alexander Hleb, Timo Hildebrand and Kevin Kurányi.

Players

First-team squad
Squad at end of season

Left club during season

Results

Bundesliga

 Stuttgart-Kaiserslautern 1–1
 1–0 Sean Dundee (45)
 1–1 Miroslav Klose (52)
 Hertha BSC-Stuttgart 1–1
 0–1 Sean Dundee (14)
 1–1 Arne Friedrich (85)
 Borussia Dortmund-Stuttgart 3–1
 1–0 Jan Koller (39)
 2–0 Leandro (66)
 2–1 Sean Dundee (76)
 3–1 Ewerthon (88)
 Stuttgart-Schalke 04 1–1
 1–0 Marcelo Bordon (34)
 1–1 Tomasz Hajto (86 pen)
 Mönchengladbach-Stuttgart 1–1
 1–0 Markus Münch (50)
 1–1 Kevin Kurányi (71)
 Stuttgart-Arminia Bielefeld 3–0
 1–0 Kevin Kurányi (5)
 2–0 Kevin Kurányi (64)
 3–0 Kevin Kurányi (69)
 Hamburg-Stuttgart 3–2
 0–1 Jochen Seitz (9)
 1–1 Bernardo Romeo (14)
 2–1 Sergej Barbarez (22)
 2–2 Alexander Hleb (25)
 3–2 Bernardo Romeo (86)
 Stuttgart-1860 Munich 4–1
 0–1 Markus Schroth (23)
 1–1 Kevin Kurányi (46)
 2–1 Kevin Kurányi (48)
 3–1 Ioan Ganea (50)
 4–1 Ioan Ganea [90)
 Nürnberg-Stuttgart 1–2
 1–0 David Jarolím (45)
 1–1 Kevin Kurányi (80)
 1–2 Ioannis Amanatidis (85)
 Stuttgart-Energie Cottbus 0–0
 Bayer Leverkusen-Stuttgart 0–1
 0–1 Silvio Meißner (19)
 Stuttgart-Bochum 3–2
 0–1 Thomas Christiansen (68)
 1–1 Ioan Ganea (74 pen)
 1–2 Sebastian Schindzielorz (84)
 2–2 Ioan Ganea (86)
 3–2 Ioan Ganea (90)
 Hansa Rostock-Stuttgart 1–1
 1–0 Rade Priča (4)
 1–1 Kevin Kurányi (46)
 Stuttgart-Hannover 3–0
 1–0 Ioannis Amanatidis (35)
 2–0 Alexander Hleb (54)
 3–0 Kevin Kurányi (73)
 Werder Bremen-Stuttgart 3–1
 1–0 Ailton (26)
 1–1 Kevin Kurányi (55)
 2–1 Mladen Krstajić (80)
 3–1 Ailton (89 pen)
 Stuttgart-Bayern Munich 0–3
 0–1 Alexander Zickler (28)
 0–2 Roque Santa Cruz (33)
 0–3 Roque Santa Cruz (68)
 Wolfsburg-Stuttgart 1–2
 0–1 Thomas Schneider (35)
 0–2 Fernando Meira (55)
 1–2 Tomislav Marić (76 pen)
 Kaiserslautern-Stuttgart 1–2
 0–1 Kevin Kurányi (29)
 1–1 Vratislav Lokvenc (34)
 1–2 Krassimir Balakov (69)
 Stuttgart-Hertha BSC 3–1
 1–0 Ioannis Amanatidis (28)
 2–0 Alexander Hleb (68)
 2–1 Marcelinho (80)
 3–1 Ioan Ganea (90)
 Stuttgart-Borussia Dortmund 1–0
 1–0 Zvonimir Soldo (75)
 Schalke 04-Stuttgart 2–0
 1–0 Émile Mpenza (3)
 2–0 Tomasz Hajto (45)
 Stuttgart-Mönchengladbach 4–0
 1–0 Kevin Kurányi (9)
 2–0 Ioannis Amanatidis (23)
 3–0 Ioan Ganea (87)
 4–0 Kevin Kurányi (88)
 Arminia Bielefeld-Stuttgart 0–1
 0–1 Silvio Meißner (13)
 Stuttgart-Hamburg 1–1
 1–0 Kevin Kurányi (20)
 1–1 Mehdi Mahdavikia (43)
 1860 Munich-Stuttgart 0–1
 0–1 Marcelo Bordon (41)
 Stuttgart-Nürnberg 0–2
 0–1 David Jarolím (28)
 0–2 Junior (88)
 Energie Cottbus-Stuttgart 2–3
 0–1 Silvio Meißner (2)
 1–1 Robert Vagner (7)
 1–2 Horst Heldt (75)
 2–2 Lars Jungnickel (84)
 2–3 Ioan Ganea (90)
 Stuttgart-Bayer Leverkusen 3–0
 1–0 Ioannis Amanatidis (9)
 2–0 Alexander Hleb (17)
 3–0 Ioan Ganea (50)
 Bochum-Stuttgart 3–1
 0–1 Kevin Kurányi (25)
 1–1 Vahid Hashemian (40)
 2–1 Vahid Hashemian (66)
 3–1 Thomas Christiansen (68)
 Stuttgart-Hansa Rostock 1–1
 1–0 Silvio Meißner (28)
 1–1 Delano Hill (59)
 Hannover-Stuttgart 1–2
 0–1 Sean Dundee (19)
 0–2 Sean Dundee (37)
 1–2 Jiří Kaufman (85)
 Stuttgart-Werder Bremen 0–1
 0–1 Rui Marques (50 og)
 Bayern Munich-Stuttgart 2–1
 1–0 Giovane Élber (46)
 2–0 Giovane Élber (76)
 2–1 Sean Dundee (83)
 Stuttgart-Wolfsburg 2–0
 1–0 Kevin Kurányi (12)
 2–0 Krassimir Balakov (24 pen)

Top scorers
  Kevin Kurányi 15
  Ioan Ganea 9
  Sean Dundee 6
  Alexander Hleb 4

UEFA Cup

1st round

 Stuttgart-Ventspils 4–1
 1–0 Ioannis Amanatidis (22)
 2–0 Kevin Kurányi (33)
 3–0 Kevin Kurányi (40)
 4–0 Alexander Hleb (60 pen)
 4–1 Vits Rimkus (65)
 Ventspils-Stuttgart 1–4
 1–0 Yevgeni Landyrev (16)
 1–1 Christian Tiffert (23)
 1–2 Ioan Ganea (52)
 1–3 Ioannis Amanatidis (87)
 1–4 Christian Tiffert (90)

2nd round

 Ferencváros-Stuttgart 0–0
 Stuttgart-Ferencváros 2–0
 1–0 Ioannis Amanatidis (65)
 2–0 Fernando Meira (90 pen)

3rd round

 Club Brugge-Stuttgart 1–2
 1–0 Peter van der Heyden (42)
 1–1 Krassimir Balakov (71)
 1–2 Kevin Kurányi (89)
 Stuttgart-Club Brugge 1–0
 1–0 Alexander Hleb (90)

Last 16

 Celtic-Stuttgart 3–1
 0–1 Kevin Kurányi (27)
 1–1 Paul Lambert (36)
 2–1 Shaun Maloney (45)
 3–1 Stilian Petrov (68)
 Stuttgart-Celtic 3–2
 0–1 Alan Thompson (12)
 0–2 Chris Sutton (14)
 1–2 Christian Tiffert (37)
 2–2 Alexander Hleb (75)
 3–2 Michael Mutzel (87)

Sources
Soccerbase

Notes

References

VfB Stuttgart seasons
Stuttgart